Vacuolar protein sorting-associated protein 72 homolog is a protein that in humans is encoded by the VPS72 gene.

Model organisms
Model organisms have been used in the study of VPS72 function. A conditional knockout mouse line called Vps72tm1a(EUCOMM)Wtsi was generated at the Wellcome Trust Sanger Institute. Male and female animals underwent a standardized phenotypic screen to determine the effects of deletion. Additional screens performed:  - In-depth immunological phenotyping

References

Further reading